Weetos is a brand of chocolate-flavoured breakfast cereal produced by Weetabix Food Company. The name comes from the fact that its primary ingredient is wheat (Weet-) and the cereal pieces are in O shapes (-Os), the same naming convention that is used on the company's flagship cereal Weetabix (Wheat Biscuits).

The brand initially began with the Weetos cereal, officially known as Weetos Chocolate Flavour, and has expanded to include Weetos Meteors, Weetos Bars (which are cereal snacks in bar-form), and Weetos Vs. Alien Invasion.

History

Weetos is the only cereal by Weetabix Food Company that is marketed toward the youth and children segment and, as a result, has a long history with mascots. The original mascot, introduced in 1987, was a skateboarder named Derek, who "found life really boring, until new Weetos came out of the blue!", delivered in a broad West Midlands accent. From 1992, the breakfast mascot was Professor Weeto, an elderly gentleman dressed in a white labcoat, whose remaining hair was white and who wore a pair of spectacles constructed from two large Weetos pieces. He was the mascot that acted as the creator and sole advertiser for the cereal. In 2010, he was replaced by The Weeto, a strong Weeto with arms and legs who'd do anything to get into the cereal for children.

In 2006, Weetabix Food Company lowered the amount of sugar present in Weetos by over 35% as part of a drive to appeal to health conscious parents, which resulted in a change of flavour. This was coupled with the dropping of long-running mascot Professor Weeto in favour of neutral images of children participating in various sports.

Products

Weetos Chocolate Flavour
Weetos is packaged in a brown rectangular cardboard box with the logo and an advert of whatever toy is inside.

Ingredients include wholegrain wheat (41%), wheat flour, sugars, cocoa powder, vegetable oil, milk powder and various vitamins and minerals.

Weetos Meteors
Launched in 2008, Weetos Meteors is a space-themed cereal that combines the original O-shape pieces with star and meteor shapes ones. It is one of the few breakfast cereals that directly advertises to children seeing as it is not high in fat, salt and sugar (HFSS) and as a result, doesn't qualify for Ofcom's ban on promotional tie-ups with HFSS food products.

Weetos vs. Alien Invaders
Launched in 2011, Weetos vs. Alien Invaders contains both the original O-shaped pieces along with three ringed alien pieces.

Weetos Bar
Weetos is also available in a 20g cereal bar. They contain chocolate flavour wheat hoops and form soft and chewy bar, with a layer of milk chocolate on the bottom, and are individually wrapped. There is however ambiguity in the calorific content, as the box listed content is 99 calories per bar while the Weetos website declares 88 calories per bar.

See also
Weetabix
Weetabix Food Company

References

External links
Weetos - Official website

Weetabix cereals